Stuart Carter (1879–1972), British admiral.

Stuart Carter may also refer to:

 Stuart B. Carter (1906–1983), Virginia lawyer and state senator
 Stuart Carter (rower) (born 1958), Australian Olympic coxswain

See also
 George Stuart Carter (1893–1969), British zoologist and zoological author